Barfield Lake may refer to:

Barfield Lake (Alabama), in Dale County, Alabama
Barfield Lake (Michigan), in Luce County, Michigan
Barfield Lake (Texas), near Grapeland, Texas